The International Workshop on First-Order Theorem Proving (FTP) is a scientific meeting of researchers interested in automated theorem proving for first-order logic and related fields. FTP workshops are less formal than many conferences, but more formal than most workshops. While FTP proceedings are published informally, most FTP workshops have resulted in a special issue of a recognized peer-reviewed academic journal.

FTP is one of the constituent meetings of the International Joint Conference on Automated Reasoning, and is merged with this conference in years where it takes place.

FTP meetings 

 FTP '97 took place at  the Research Institute for Symbolic Computation in Linz, Austria in Austria, October 27–28, 1997
 FTP '98 took place in Vienna, Austria, November 23–25, 1998
 FTP '00 took place in St. Andrews, Scotland, July 3–5, 2000
 In 2001 FTP was merged into the first IJCAR
 FTP '03 took place in Valencia, Spain, June 12–14, 2003, as part of the Federated Conference on Rewriting, Deduction and Programming.
 In 2004, FTP was merged into the second IJCAR
 FTP '05 took place in Koblenz, Germany, September 14–17, 2005 
 In 2006, FTP was merged into the third IJCAR
 FTP '07 took place in Liverpool, United Kingdom, September 12–13, 2007
 In 2008, FTP was merged into the fourth IJCAR
 FTP '09 took place in Oslo, Norway, July 6–7, 2009
 In 2010, FTP was merged into the fifth IJCAR
 FTP '11 took place in Bern, Switzerland, July 4, 2011

Theoretical computer science conferences
Logic conferences